or Maple Viewing (English title) is a Japanese narrative, performed as theatre in kabuki as shosagoto (dance-focused play) and Noh. It was also the first narrative ever filmed in Japan. The Noh play was written by Kanze Nobumitsu during the Muromachi period. Other titles for the play include Yogoshōgun and Koremochi.

The Noh Play
Momijigari was originally a Noh play, written by Kanze Nobumitsu (d. 1516).

A beautiful woman of seemingly high rank (played by the shite or lead actor), along with her retinue of female attendants (the tsure) are visiting Togakushi-yama, a mountain in Shinano Province, here for the seasonal maple-leaf viewing. The group commence a banquet.

A warrior of the Taira clan who has been out deer-hunting approaches. Rather than to disturb the party by riding past, he dismounts, intending to leave. But he is accosted by the lady to drink sake with her. Koremochi becomes drunk, and the lady forces more drinks on him. At this point the lady's dance increases a more furious tempo, changing from chū no mai to kyū no mai. When Koremochi falls asleep, she abandons him, saying never to wake from his dream.

There is a change of scenery, and everything turns bleak and dreary.

The lady has now transformed into a fire-breathing demon in the glow of lightning (the noh mask used are traditionally  but hannya has come into use.) but the warrior is undaunted, and after a pitched battle, slays the demon with the sword.

Kabuki and puppet play adaptations

The work was adapted for the jōruri puppet theater by Chikamatsu Monzaemon in 1715, under the title Momijigari Tsurugi no Honji '"Viewing the Autumn Foliage and the True Origin of the Sword").

It was also remade for the kabuki theater a number of times during the Edo period, but usually as short dance pieces.

Kabuki dance in Meiji

In 1887, a kabuki dance version of the play was staged, starring the popular actor Ichikawa Danjūrō IX as Sarashinahime (demon).

This performance followed the script newly written by Kawatake Mokuami in Meiji Period, based on an earlier work of 1849. It adheres to the basic plot of the Noh play, but with some differences. The demon-princess is given the name Sarashina-hime, the deity warning the warrior is now a Yamagami ("mountain god") sent by Hachiman, and the divine sword given to the warrior Koremochi is identified as the Kogarasumaru. The demon employs a maple branch to parry Koremochi's sword, until the branch is knocked off its hand. It then uses its glaring gaze to immobilize Koremochi. But the magic sword continues fighting of its own accord and kills the demon.

This version was written to be accompanied by Takemoto, nagauta and Tokiwazu music.

It was an unprecedented performance, with the reigning Emperor Meiji officially in the audience, as kabuki had customarily been deemed beneath the dignity of viewing by the higher echelons of society. The performance also led to the first narrative filmed in Japan.

The 1899 film

Ichikawa Danjūrō IX, with Onoe Kikugoro V as Koremochi, revived the kabuki version in 1899, which was filmed and became the first motion picture to be made in Japan. It was by director Shibata Tsunekichi.

Danjūrō was originally opposed to appearing in films, but was eventually convinced that his doing so would be a gift to posterity.

The film is available for viewing at the National Film Center in Tokyo. As one of Japan's earliest films, it was designated an Important Cultural Property in 2009.

Explanatory notes

References
Citations

Bibliography

External links
 Momijigari at the Kabuki resource

Japanese short films
Japanese plays
Noh plays